R60 may refer to:

Automobiles 
 BMW R60, a motorcycle
 Mini Countryman (R60), a sport utility vehicle
 Toyota Noah (R60), a minivan

Other uses 
 R-60 (missile), a Soviet air-to-air missile
 R60 (South Africa), a road
 Aeryon SkyRanger R60, an unmanned aerial vehicle
 R60: May impair fertility, a risk phrase
 R60, a commuter rail service on the Llobregat–Anoia Line, in Barcelona, Catalonia, Spain
 R60, a Ferris wheel designed by Ronald Bussink